DS-P1-Yu was a series of Soviet satellites developed by the Yuzhnoye Design Office of Ukraine, for use in calibrating the Dnestr space surveillance and early-warning radar system. Between 1964 and 1976, a total of 79 satellites were launched on Kosmos-2I 63S1 launchers, with seven failing to reach orbit.

They were covered in solar panels and a metallic mesh transparent to visible spectrum light and opaque to radio frequencies.

The DS-P1-Yu replaced the similar DS-P1, of which four were launched between 1962 and 1964, with one failure to reach orbit.

References

Soviet military spacecraft